Ramapuram is a revenue village in Cuddalore district in state of Tamil Nadu, India.

Ramapuram 
 Official Web Site of Cuddalore District

References 

Villages in Cuddalore district
Cities and villages in Cuddalore taluk